Besiekiery  is a village in the administrative district of Gmina Grabów, within Łęczyca County, Łódź Voivodeship, in central Poland.

Sites of interest
There is a ruined castle in the village.

References

Besiekiery